The Confederation of Finnish Industries (EK) is the largest employers' association in Finland. It was formed at the beginning of 2005 when the two employers' associations Palvelutyönantajat (Employers of the Service Sector) and Teollisuuden ja Työnantajain Keskusliitto (Union of Industries and Employers) merged. EK's member companies collectively contribute over 70% of Finland's GDP, and over 95% of Finland's exports. It has considerable negotiating power, since Finland has universal validity of collective labour agreements, and often a national income policy agreement is reached.

EK focuses its activity on the following goals:
 A business environment which stimulates growth and success for companies
 Securing the competitiveness of Finnish work
 Ways to benefit from the opportunities offered by globalisation
 Economic policies promoting competitiveness
 Efficient member services

The organisation consists of:
 43 branch associations
 About 15,000 member companies, 96% of which are small and medium enterprises (SMEs)
 About 900,000 employees

External links
The Confederation of Finnish Industries  Official site

Economy of Finland
2005 establishments in Finland
Organizations established in 2005
Business organisations based in Finland